Robbie Ryan (born 1970)  is an Irish cinematographer, serving as the director of photography whose work has spanned on over 106 film projects, including feature-length, short films, commercials, and music videos. He is most known for his collaborations with film auteurs such as Andrea Arnold, Sally Potter, Stephen Frears, Ken Loach, Noah Baumbach, Yorgos Lanthimos and Mike Mills.

He received an Academy Award nomination for Best Cinematography for Yorgos Lanthimos' The Favourite (2018).

Life and career
Ryan was born in Ireland. At the age of 14, he decided he wanted to be a cinematographer. He attended and graduated the Dún Laoghaire Institute of Art, Design and Technology.

Ryan is a frequent collaborator on Andrea Arnold's films, including Wasp, Red Road, Fish Tank, Wuthering Heights and American Honey. He has worked with Ken Loach on the films The Angels' Share, Jimmy's Hall, and I, Daniel Blake. He served as the director of photography on films including Philomena, Slow West and The Favourite, the latter of which earned him a nomination for the Academy Award for Best Cinematography at the 91st Academy Awards.

Filmography

Videography

Awards and nominations

References

External links

1970 births
Living people
Alumni of IADT
Irish cinematographers
European Film Award for Best Cinematographer winners